The Lambda Literary Award for Gay Memoir/Biography is an annual literary award, presented by the Lambda Literary Foundation, to a memoir, biography, autobiography, or works of creative nonfiction by or about gay men. Works published posthumously and/or written with co-authors are eligible, but anthologies are not.

Between 1994 and 2000, the award was given to biographies and autobiographies. The category was changed to memoirs and biographies in 2007.

Recipients

References 

Gay Memoir
Awards established in 1994
English-language literary awards
Lists of LGBT-related award winners and nominees